Sinan Demircioğlu (born 23 April 1975) is a Turkish retired footballer.

Sinan Demircioğlu is a former Turkey U21 internationals and has been played 151 matches in Süper Lig, 74 matches in 1. Lig and 100 matches at 1. Lig prior it reduced from 50 teams to 20 teams in 2001.

Career

Beşiktaş
Sinan Demircioğlu started his career at Beşiktaş which is one of the Turkish Big-Three. He was promoted to first team in 1995-96 season at age of 20. Before that, he also played for the youth teams at PAF League and BAL Ligi. With Beşiktaş, he was call-up to Turkey U18 team at 1992 UEFA European Under-18 Football Championship and 1993 UEFA European Under-18 Football Championship qualification. He also played for Turkish U20 team at 1993 FIFA World Youth Championship, Turkish Olympic team (de facto U21 team) at 1997 Mediterranean Games.

İstanbul Büyükşehir Belediyespor
After the tournament he was loaned to İstanbul Büyükşehir Belediyespor of TFF First League (at that time Second League prior the formation of the Turkish Super League) which also located in Istanbul. He played for the club for 5 seasons.

Göztepe & Diyarbakırspor
Sinan Demircioğlu returned to the Turkish top division in 2002–03 season, signed for Göztepe. After a season he left for Diyarbakırspor where he played another 3 seasons in the Turkish Süper Lig.

Late career
In August 2006 he left for his last Super League club Gaziantepspor on free transfer, but in September 2006 he signed for Samsunspor of TFF First League. He just played 16 times in his second season before he left the club as free agent.

In August 2008 he was signed by Körfez Belediyespor of TFF Second League.

Honours
Beşiktaş
Chancellor Cup: 1997

UEFA European Under-18 Football Championship: 1992

Career statistics
Club statistics

As of 20 December 2009

1As First League
2Include 1 match at Chancellor Cup
3As Second League with 50 to 51 teams
4As Second League A with 18 to 20 teams

External links
Profile at TFF

Footballers from Istanbul
Turkey under-21 international footballers
Süper Lig players
Beşiktaş J.K. footballers
İstanbul Başakşehir F.K. players
Göztepe S.K. footballers
Diyarbakırspor footballers
Gaziantepspor footballers
Samsunspor footballers
Association football defenders
1975 births
Living people
Turkey youth international footballers
Mediterranean Games silver medalists for Turkey
Competitors at the 1997 Mediterranean Games
Mediterranean Games medalists in football
Turkish footballers